Sir William Booth (fl. 1673–1689), captain in the Royal Navy, was promoted to that rank in June 1673.

Later military career
After the peace with the Dutch he was for several years employed in the Mediterranean, and more especially against the Algerine pirates. She proved, however, to be the English ship , commanded by Captain Francis Wheler, and to her the Golden Horse at once submitted without further resistance. A somewhat acrimonious dispute afterwards arose between the others and men of the two ships as to their relative share in the capture, which also involved John Benbow, Captain Wheler assuming all the honour to himself, and claiming the whole profit of the prize. The question was referred by Booth to the admiralty, who, without any evidence beyond Booth's partial statement, directed the commander-in-chief to "cause the colours of the Golden Horse to be delivered to Captain Booth as a mark of honour which we Judge he hath well deserved", and also an appointed share of the value of the prize.

In 1683 he commanded ; in September 1688 he was appointed to the 70-gun ; and in the following February, having given in his allegiance to King William, he was knighted and appointed Commissioner of the Navy.  It would appear that his profession of allegiance was but a  blind to enable him the better to act as agent to the exiled James; for on 16 March he went down the river to the Pendennis, then lying at Sheerness, and endeavoured by his personal influence and promises of money to persuade the lieutenants to agree with him in carrying over the ship to France; the plot also involved carrying over the fireship , commanded by Captain Wilford, who seemed to acquiesce. But Wilford got too drunk to act the part designed for him, and the lieutenants refused to have anything to do with it, or to let the Pendennis go; on which Booth, conceiving that he had gone too far, and that the affair could not be kept secret, fled to France.  No account remains of his further life or of his death.

References

DNB references
These references are found in the DNB article referred to above.

External links
 

Year of birth missing
Year of death missing
Place of birth unknown
Royal Navy officers
1680s conflicts
17th-century Royal Navy personnel